Latir Peak Wilderness is a  wilderness area located within the Carson National Forest in northern New Mexico. Designated in 1980, the wilderness is composed of dense forest, meadows, and alpine tundra on Latir Mesa in the northern portion. Most of the area is drained by the Lake Fork of Cabresto Creek, which originates at Heart Lake and is impounded just outside the wilderness in Cabresto Lake, the main trailhead for visitors entering the wilderness.

Wildlife
A variety of wildlife can be found in Latir Peak Wilderness, including mule deer, black bear, badger, beaver, bobcat, coyote, ferret, fox, mountain lion, boreal owl, marmot, marten, pika, ptarmigan, and muskrat. Native Rio Grande cutthroat trout are found in the area's streams.

See also
 Latir volcanic field
List of U.S. Wilderness Areas
Wilderness Act

References

External links

Carson National Forest - US Forest Service
Latir Peak Wilderness - New Mexico Wilderness Alliance
Latir Peak Wilderness - Wilderness.net
Latir Peak Wilderness - GORP

Protected areas of Taos County, New Mexico
Wilderness areas of New Mexico
Carson National Forest